Richard Gottinger (4 June 1926 – 5 March 2008) was a German international footballer who played for ASV Fürth and SpVgg Fürth.

References

External links
 

1926 births
2008 deaths
Association football midfielders
German footballers
Germany international footballers
SpVgg Greuther Fürth players
Sportspeople from Fürth
Footballers from Bavaria